William Schreiber may refer to:
William Schreiber (volleyball) (born 1942), Romanian Olympic volleyball player
William F. Schreiber (1925–2009), American electrical engineer and MIT professor 
William R. Schreiber (born 1941), American politician, member of the Minnesota House of Representatives
William E. Schreiber (1880–?), American college football player and coach